The 1997 South American Under-17 Football Championship was played in Paraguay from 28 February to 16 March 1997.

The host of the competition were the cities of Asunción, Pedro Juan Caballero and Encarnación.

Sandro Hiroshi was banned for 180 days in 1999 when it was discovered that his age had been falsified in the 1997 tournament. Brazil did not face team sanctions as the federation argued that Hiroshi acted without its authorization.

First round
The 10 national teams were divided in 2 groups of 5 teams each. The top 2 teams qualified for the final round.

Group A

Group B

Final round
The final round were played in the same system that first round, with the best 4 teams.

Brazil, Argentina and Chile qualify to FIFA U-17 World Cup, Egypt '97

Top goalscorers

Ideal Team of the Tournament

References
 South American U-17 Championship 1997 (Paraguay) Rec.Sport.Soccer Statistics Foundation

South American Under-17 Football Championship
Under
International association football competitions hosted by Paraguay
1997 in Paraguayan football
1997 in youth association football